Ukai Songadh railway station is a railway station in Tapi district of Gujarat state of India. It is under Mumbai WR railway division of Western Railway zone of Indian Railways. Ukai Songadh railway station is 18 km far away from Vyara railway station. It serves Songadh and Ukai town. It is located on Udhna – Jalgaon main line of the Indian Railways.

It is located at 144 m above sea level and has two platform. As of 2016, electrified double broad-gauge railway line exists at this station. Passenger, MEMU trains halt here.

See also
Vyara railway station
Tapi district

References

Railway stations in Tapi district
Mumbai WR railway division